Duliskan-e Vosta (also Romanized as Dūlīskān-e Vosţá; also known as Dūlīs Kān) is a village in Qaedrahmat Rural District, Zagheh District, Khorramabad County, Lorestan Province, Iran. At the 2006 census, its population was 305, in 25 families.

References 

Towns and villages in Khorramabad County